Uncle Jam Wants You is the eleventh  studio album by American funk rock band Funkadelic. It was originally released by Warner Bros. Records on September 21, 1979, and was later reissued on CD by Charly Groove Records and Priority Records. It was produced by George Clinton under the alias Dr. Funkenstein. It is the first Funkadelic album since America Eats Its Young in 1972 not to sport a cover illustrated by Funkadelic artist Pedro Bell, though Bell did provide artwork for the album’s back cover and interior. Uncle Jam Wants You was the second Funkadelic album to be certified gold. The album peaked at #18 on the US Billboard 200 and #2 on the US Billboard Top R&B/Hip-Hop Albums charts.

Significance
In some ways, Uncle Jam Wants You (a reference to the "Uncle Sam wants you!" US Army recruitment posters) is a more militant sequel to the group's previous album, One Nation Under a Groove. Whereas that album described an ideal country ruled by Funk, "Uncle Jam" attempts to provoke the conversion into Funkadelia. Its purpose is also (as the cover claims) to "rescue dance music from the blahs."

The cover art depicts George Clinton in a Huey Newton-Black Panthers pose, reflecting the more martial lyrical themes of the album. The album features the band's last big hit single, "(Not Just) Knee Deep", an edited version of which went to number one on the Billboard Soul singles charts. This album had a profound influence on the West Coast hip-hop scene, especially the legendary DJ organization known as Uncle Jamm's Army.

Samples of the 15-minute cut "(Not Just) Knee Deep" can be heard in De La Soul's "Me Myself and I" (1989), the Teddy Riley-produced "Get Away," and several of Dr. Dre's productions.

Reception
 Allmusic.com "Uncle Jam Wants You takes not merely a more daring musical approach but a more forthright political stance".
Rolling Stone (10/3/02, p. 106) - 4 stars out of 5 - "The home of 'Freak Of The Week' (which launched a thousand g-funk songs)."

Track listing

Side One
"Freak of the Week" (George Clinton, Jr., Pete Bishop, DeWayne McKnight) - 5:34
"(Not Just) Knee Deep" (G. Clinton, Jr.) - 15:23 (released as two-part single WBS 49040)

Side Two
"Uncle Jam" (G. Clinton, Jr., Garry Shider, Bernie Worrell, Bootsy Collins) - 10:26 (released as two-part single WB 49117)
"Field Maneuvers" (Darryll Clinton, Donna Lynn Clinton) - 2:25
"Holly Wants to Go to California" (G. Clinton, Jr., Worrell) - 4:24
"Foot Soldiers (Star-Spangled Funky)" (G. Clinton., Jr., Jim Vitti) - 3:31

Personnel
Funkadelic Rescue Dance Band (as given in the liner notes)
Axe Force:
 Fret Commanders Michael "Kidd Funkadelic" Hampton, Gary "DooWop" Shider, Eddie "Maggot Brain" Hazel
Keyboard Battlecruisers:
 Bernie (U.S.S. Woo!) Worrell, J.S. Theracon
Uncle Jam's Drums and Percussion:
 Tyrone "Speedfeet" Lampkin, Larry Fratangelo
Bass Anti-Flam Units:
 Rodney "Skeet" Curtis, Cordell "Boogie" Mosson
Uncle Jam's Drumset, and funky beatz:
 Dennis Chambers
Vocal Assault & Funkatition Team:
 Uncle Jam Clinton, Gary "DooWop" Shider, Larry "Sir Nose" Heckstall, Sheila Horn, Ron "Prophet" Ford, Jeanette McGruder, Dawn Silva, Michael "Clip" Payne, Greg Thomas, Ray "Stingray" Davis
Mallia Franklin is credited as a background vocalist, but she was the female lead singer on the song "Freak of the Week".

Additional Musicians
Guitars:
 William Collins, Dewayne McKnight, Glenn Goins
Bass:
 Billy Bass Nelson, William Collins, Jeff Bunn
Keyboards:
 Junie Morrison, Gary Hudgins, Gerome Rogers
Drums:
 Tiki Fulwood, William Collins, Dennis Chambers, Jerome Brailey
Background Vocals:
 Linda Brown, Jessica Cleaves, Mallia Franklin, Philippe Wynne, Lige Curry, James Wesley, Greg Boyer, Gerome Rogers
According to Jerome Brailey, Tiki Fulwood is credited on the recording but didn't actually perform.

Photography
Diem Jones

References

External links
 Uncle Jam Wants You at Discogs
 the Motherpage

1979 albums
Funkadelic albums
Warner Records albums
Albums with cover art by Pedro Bell